The Burmese–Siamese War of 1849–1855 or Siamese Invasions of Kengtung or Kengtung Wars were military expeditions of the Siamese Rattanakosin Kingdom against the Tai Khün State of Kengtung, which had been under Burmese suzerainty under the Konbaung dynasty. The dynastic struggles in Tai Lue State of Chiang Hung or Sipsongpanna prompted Siam, in cooperation with the Kingdom of Lanna (Northern Thailand), to invade Kengtung in order to gain access to Chiang Hung. In the First Invasion in 1850, the Siamese court had ordered the Lanna Lord of Chiangmai to organize the offensives against Kengtung. Lanna troops failed to conquer Kengtung. Two other expeditions occurred in 1852 and 1853 as Bangkok commanded its troops to directly participate in the invasions. Both expeditions also failed because of internal issues and geographical unfamiliarity. The State of Kengtung under the leadership of Saopha Maha Hkanan, with limited assistance from Burma who had been embroiling in the Second Anglo-Burmese War, managed to resist Siamese-Lanna invasions three times.

Prelude to conflict

History of Kengtung
Kengtung was founded as a city by King Mangrai of Ngoenyang in 1253 and later became part of the Tai Yuan Kingdom of Lanna, which encompasses modern Northern Thailand. In 1350, King Phayu of Lanna sent his son to rule Kengtung. His dynasty would continue to rule Kengtung for another six hundred years until 1959. Kengtung later freed itself from Lanna and developed its own ethno-cultural entity as Tai Khun people. In 1558, the Kingdom of Lanna fell to King Bayinnaung of the Burmese Toungoo dynasty. The ruler of Kengtung submitted to the Burmese rule. The Burmese court appointed the local ruler of Kengtung, who had descended from the Mangrai clan, as Saopha under Burmese domination.

In the late eighteenth century to early nineteenth century, Lanna had freed itself from Burmese domination and came under Siamese rule. The Lanna Lords adopted the policy of “Picking vegetables into baskets, putting men in towns” to wage wars to seek manpower. The Northern Tai states of Kengtung and Chiang Hung, known collectively in Thai sources as "Lü-Khün", were the main victims of forced resettlement policy to repopulate the Lanna region, which had been ravaged by prolonged warfare. In 1802, Phaya Kawila of Chiangmai sent his younger brother Phaya Upahad Thammalangka to capture Mong Hsat and Kengtung, forcibly deporting thousands of Khun people from Kengtung and Mong Hsat to resettle in Chiangmai. Sao Kawng Tai, the then saopha of Kengtung, fled and later submit to Chiangmai authority in 1804. Maha Hkanan, younger brother of Sao Kawng Tai, established himself at Mongyang as an independent ruler. Maha Hkanan endured many invasions from Burma, who sought to reclaim Kengtung. After the protracted guerilla warfare, Maha Khanan decided to accept the Burmese suzerainty in 1813 and Kengtung once again came under Burmese rule.

Dynastic conflicts in Chiang Hung
Khun Chueang or Phaya Chueang founded the city of Chianghung of Chiangrung (modern Jinghong) and the Tai Lue confederacy of Sipsongpanna (Twelve “pannas”, corresponding to modern Xishuangbanna Dai Autonomous Prefecture) in around 1180. Sipsongpanna was incorporated into the Lanna Kingdom by King Mangrai. The Mongols of Yuan dynasty invaded Sipsongpanna and Chianghung surrendered to the Mongols in 1296. The subsequent Ming and Qing appointed the Tai Lue rulers of Chianghung as native governor or Tusi with  the title of "Chēlǐ Pacification Commissioner" ( pinyin: Chēlǐ xuānwèishǐ). The city of Chianghung was known as Chēlǐ. The Chinese sent a seal to confirm the rulers of Sipsongpanna. In 1563, King Bayinnaung of Burma captured Chianghung. The Burmese and the Chinese agreed on the joint domination over Sipsongpanna, whose ruler was enthroned in a ceremony in which both Burmese and Chinese representatives jointly presided. "China was the father, Burma was the mother." The rulers of Chianghung then had to seek confirmation from both China and Burma.

In 1802, Prince Mahavong the ruler of Chianghung died. His two-year-son Prince Tsau Mahanavi was confirmed to succeed his father under the regency of Prince Tsau Mahavang, who had been Mahanavi's uncle. When Mahanavi reached maturity in 1817, he personally assumed the governorship. King Bodawpaya summoned Prince Mahanavi of Chianghung to Amarapura to confirm his submission. Mahanavi did not go and sent his uncle Mahavang to go to Amarapura instead. King Bodawpaya was angered at Mahanavi's defiance and enfeoffed Mahavang to replace his nephew as the ruler of Chianghung. The civil war between Tsau Mahanavi and Tsau Mahavang in Sipsongpanna ensued for decades. In 1834, the Qing, who supported Mahavang, managed to chase Mahanavi off Chianghung. Mahanavi fled and died.

In 1836, Prince Mahavang of Chianghung died. His son Tsau Suvanna was made to succeed him and Mahavang's another younger son Amaravuth was made Upahad or heir. However, his nemesis Mahanavi had left a son named Nokham. Prince Nokham gained support from the Burmese court under King Tharrawaddy Min to support him against Suvanna. King Tharawaddy Min of Burma sent the Burmese Sitke general to lead a Burmese army of 3,000 men to invade Chianghung and to put Nokham on the Tai Lue throne in 1836. Lady Pinkaew, wife of Mahavang and mother of Suvanna and Amaravuth, bribed the Burmese Sitke to retreat. The Sitke general captured Chianghung and made Nokham the ruler of Chianghung. Seven days after, Lord Mahaxay of Mengpeng who was a supporter of Suvanna led troops to recapture Chianghung. The Burmese general then feigned retreat along with Nokham as he was bribed by Lady Pinkaew. Mahaxay of Mengpeng restored Suvanna to the throne of Chianghung.

Prince Nokham did not give up. He persuaded King Tharrawaddy to send another army of 10,000 men to capture Chianghung again in his favor in 1838. Four years later in 1842, the Qing authorities in Yunnan encouraged Mahaxay of Mengpeng to successfully retake Chianghung and restore Suvanna to the throne for the second time. This time Suvanna managed to secure confirmation from the Burmese Ava court. Everything seemed peaceful until Nokham took Chianghung again in 1849. Prince Suvanna fled to Ava. His brother Amaravuth and his mother Pinkaew took refuge in Luang Phrabang, which had been under Siamese suzerainty. Mahaxay fled to Sainyabuli. King Sukkhasoem of Luang Phrabang then sent the Tai Lue royals; Amaravuth, Lady Pinkaew and Mahaxay to Bangkok.

First Siamese Invasion of Kengtung (1850)

King Rama III sent troops to assist Tsau Suvanna of Chiang Hung against Nokham to uphold the chakravatin ideology of universal ruler, which signified the honor and power of the Siamese kingdom in the region. However, in order to take Chiang Hung, Siam had to occupy Kengtung first as its provided line of communications. The Bangkok court did not directly involve by sending its own troops to realize the goal. Instead, the Lanna lords of Chiangmai and Lamphun were assigned for the mission. King Rama III ordered Phraya Mahavong the Ruler of Chiangmai to arrange Lanna armies into Kengtung. Phraya Mahavong of Chiangmai then mustered the Lanna army composing of 5,000 men from Chiangmai, 1,500 men from Lamphun and 1,000 men from Lampang. The regiments were arranged in the following orders to invade Kengtung;

Army of Phraya Upahad Phimphisara and Phraya Burirattana (son of King Kawila) would march through Chiang Rai to reach Kengtung.
Army of Phraya Raxabut and Noi Mahaphrom (son of Phraya Mahavong) would march through Mong Hsat.

The two armies left Chiangmai for Kengtung in February 1850. The army of Phraya Raxabut and Noi Mahaphrom successfully captured Mong Hsat, where they continued to Mong Gouk and captured several satellite towns of Kengtung. They eventually laid siege on Kengtung in March 1850.

When the army of Phraya Upahad Phimphisara had reached Chiang Rai, he ordered Phraya Burirattana to attack and capture Mong Hpayak. Upahad Phimphisara himself negotiated a peaceful surrender from Mong Yawng and stationed there. Phraya Raxabut and Noi Mahaphrom led assaults on the walls of Kengtung but saopha Maha Hkanan of Kengtung successfully repelled the invaders. The Lanna side suffered from manpower shortage as the army of Upahad Phimphisara did not coalesce with them at Kengtung as planned. Noi Mahaphrom sent his man to urge Upahad Phimphisara at Mong Yawng to reinforce them at Kengtung but Upahad Phimphisara did not respond. After being depleted of gunpowder with Kengtung persisted, Phraya Raxabut and Noi Mahaphrom decided to retreat the Lanna troops from Kengtung.

The First Invasion of Kengtung by Lanna in 1850 did not succeed. Maha Hkanan managed to strongly repel the Lanna invaders. The discord among the Lanna lords prevented them from successfully taking Kengtung in the same manner with what they had accomplished before in 1802. Phraya Mahavong of Chiangmai issued a letter of apology to King Rama III at Bangkok, beseeching him for Bangkokian assisting troops and additional cooperation from Nan. However, the king had been ill. King Rama III died in April 1851.

Second Siamese Invasion of Kengtung (1852–1854)

The expedition against Kengtung in 1850 did not succeed and Siam failed to support Suvanna and to gain control of Kengtung and Chiang Hung. The Qing raised an army to defeat Nokham at Chiang Hung and Nokham was killed. The Qing managed to restore Suvanna to the throne of Sipsongpanna. Amaravuth, Lady Pinkaew and Mahaxay, the Tai Lue royals, who had been staying in Bangkok for about three years, took the permission of King Mongkut to return to the north. Amaravuth and Lady Pinkaew returned to Luang Phrabang, while Mahaxay returned to Nan.

In 1852, Suvanna of Chiang Hung dispatched a mission, along with ceremonial golden and silver trees, to Bangkok to request the return of his family members to Chiang Hung. King Mongkut granted the permission for the Tai Lue royals to return to their homeland. However, the ministers at the court of Bangkok petitioned to King Mongkut to send another expedition into Chiang Hung. Like the previous occasion in 1850, Siam had to take Kengtung first before proceeding to Chiang Hung. Burma was then being embroiled in the Second Anglo-Burmese War and should not be able to provided supports to Kengtung, which was a tributary state of Burma. King Mongkut then ordered the following armies, with total number of 10,000 men, to Kengtung. On this occasion Bangkok was involved directly by sending its troops in the campaigns;

Prince Vongsathirat Sanid, younger half-brother of King Mongkut, would lead an army through Phitsanulok and Nan to Kengtung.
Chao Phraya Yommaraj Nuch would lead an army through Tak and Chiangmai to Kengtung. He was to join by the Lanna forces under the leadership of Phraya Upahad Phimphisara and Phraya Burirattana.
The two armies planned to converge at Chiang Saen before proceeding to Mong Hpayak and then to Kengtung.

First Expedition (1852)
Chao Phraya Yommaraj Nuch left Bangkok with his army in November 1852. He proceeded through Kamphaengphet and Tak, drafting the conscripted militias along the way. Yommaraj Nuch reached Chiangmai in January 1853. Prince Vongsathirat Sanid left Bangkok in December 1852 with his army. He proceeded through Nakhon Sawan, Phitsanulok, reaching Nan in February 1853. He was reinforced and supplied by Phraya Mongkol Vorayot the ruler of Nan. Yommaraj Nuch and his army left Chiangmai for Chiang Saen in February. However, the Lanna Chiangmai-Lamphun armies were delayed. Prince Vongsathirat Sanid eventually reached Chiang Saen in February, where he met Chao Phraya Yommaraj Nuch. The prince ordered Chao Phraya Yommaraj Nuch to be his vanguard, with the joint Bangkok-Chiangmai army of total 5,042 men, who left first from Chiang Saen to Mong Hpayak in March.

Chao Phraya Yommaraj Nuch, with Upahad Phimphisara and Phraya Burirattana, managed to capture Mong Hsat in March. They proceeded to lay siege on Kengtung in April 1852, taking position on a hill to the southeast of Kengtung and shelled the city with their canons. In the Battle of Kengtung, again, Maha Hkanan of Kengtung led the defense against Siamese-Lanna intruders. The Siamese-Lanna had problems with manpower shortage as they were unable to completely encircle the city of Kengtung in the siege. Another issue was that Kengtung was a hill fort and the Siamese occupied relative lowland positions, complicating the abilities of their canons to inflict damages onto the higher elevations.

Prince Vongsathirat Sanid also ordered Phraya Mongkol Vorayot of Nan to lead the Nan armies to Chiang Hung. Phraya Mongkol Vorayot marched his army to reach Mengpeng in April 1852, where he sent his men to Chiang Hung to meet Tsau Suvanna of Chiang Hung and Qing delegates.

Prince Vongsathirat Sanid followed his vanguard and marched through Mong Hpayak to reach Kengtung. Yommarach Nuch ordered Lanna regiment to assault on Kengtung city walls but were repelled by Maha Hkanan. After seven days of siege, Kengtung did not yield and the Siamese-Lanna decided to retreat. Yommaraj Nuch marched his army back to Chiangmai with himself going further down south to Tak, while Prince Vongsathirat Sanid retreated back to Nan. As the rainy season approached, which would further cripple the warfare, Prince Vongsathirat Sanid then asked the king to try another expedition in the dry season next year.

Second Expedition (1853–54)
Prince Vongsathirat Sanid took the rainy season break at Nan and Chao Phraya Yommaraj Nuch at Tak. King Mongkut sent Chao Phraya Sri Suriyawongse to bring ammunitions and supplies to the north. Sri Suriyawongse and Yommaraj Nuch traveled to meet Prince Vongsathirat Sanid at Uttaradit, where they planned for the incoming second expedition to Kengtung, in November 1853. Chao Phraya Sri Suriyawongse then returned to Bangkok. The Siamese spent their time in Lanna farming grains for supplies during the rainy season of 1853. The Burmese, however, managed to get Burmese and Shan troops from Mongnai to garrison at Kengtung to be additional forces.

Prince Vongsathirat Sanid resumed the campaigns in dry season of the year 1853. He personally marched from Nan to lay siege to Kengtung for the second time. Kengtung was well reinforced by the Burmese and Shan regiments and was even better at repelling Siamese attacks. As he ran out of food supplies and gunpowder, Prince Vongsathirat Sanid finally decided to retreat to Nan. However, the Burmese, upon seeing the Siamese retreat, inflicted the counter-offensive on retreating Siamese troops. Phraya Mongkol Vorayot of Nan then acted as rearguard to defend the Siamese armies against the Burmese counter-attacks. Prince Vongsathirat Sanid retreated safely to Nan in 1854. Yommaraj Nuch, who had marched halfway to Kengtung, retreated to Chiangmai upon learning of the prince's defeat.

The Siamese then realized that the unfamiliar mountainous geography and great distance from Bangkok deemed the Siamese occupation of Kengtung unlikely. King Mongkut ordered Prince Vongsathirat Sanid and Chao Phraya Yommaraj Nuch to pull the troops back to Bangkok in 1854.

The Tai Lue royalties had been staying in Luang Phrabang and Nan. A Qing delegated arrived in Luang Phrabang requesting for the return of Amaravuth, Lady Pinkaew and Mahaxay to Chiang Hung. The Bangkok court conceded and the Tai Lue royals eventually returned to their homeland. The dynastic conflicts among the Tai Lue royals continued, however, as Mahaxay later killed Amaravuth and Tsau Suvanna, in turn, had Mahaxay executed.

Aftermath
King Mongkut awarded the Lanna Lords with ranks and titles for their contributions in the war. Phraya Mahavong, the ruler of Chiangmai, was crowned as King Mahotaraprathet of Chiangmai as a tributary king by King Mongkut in 1853. No one had been awarded with the title of King of Chiangmai since when King Kawila was crowned as King of Chiangmai by King Rama I in 1803, Chiangmai rulers after Kawila were given the rank of Phraya. However, King Mahotaraprathet passed away five months later in 1854. Phraya Upahad Phimphisara also died in 1854. King Mongkut then made Phraya Burirattana, a son of King Kawila, as King Kawilorot Suriyawong the ruler of Chiangmai in 1854. Phraya Mongkol Vorayot, the ruler of Nan, was also promoted to Prince Chao Ananta Voraritthidet.

After the Burmese defeat in Third Anglo-Burmese War in 1885, Burma then came under British rule as a part of British India. The Shan States and Kengtung, which had been traditionally under Burmese sovereignty, also came under British domination. Kengtung, along with the Shan States, became princely states with nominal sovereignty under British rule. The Federated Shan States was created in 1922 to facilitate the transfer of Shan States to the Governor of Burma.

See also
 Burmese–Siamese wars
 Burma–Thailand relations

References

Burmese–Siamese wars
Konbaung dynasty
Wars involving the Rattanakosin Kingdom
19th century in Siam
19th century in Burma
1849 in Southeast Asia
1850 in Southeast Asia
1851 in Southeast Asia
1852 in Southeast Asia
1853 in Southeast Asia
1854 in Southeast Asia
1855 in Southeast Asia
Conflicts in 1849
Conflicts in 1850
Conflicts in 1851
Conflicts in 1852
Conflicts in 1853
Conflicts in 1854
Conflicts in 1855
19th-century military history of Thailand
1840s in Asia
1850s in Asia
1849 in Burma
1850 in Burma
1851 in Burma
1852 in Burma
1853 in Burma
1854 in Burma
1855 in Burma
1800s in Burma
1840s in Burma
1850s in Burma
1849 in Siam
1850 in Siam
1851 in Siam
1852 in Siam
1853 in Siam
1854 in Siam
1855 in Siam
1840s in Siam
1850s in Siam